Cercis  is a genus of about 10 species in the subfamily  Cercidoideae of the pea family Fabaceae, native to warm temperate regions. It contains small deciduous trees or large shrubs commonly known as redbuds. They are characterised by simple, rounded to heart-shaped leaves and pinkish-red flowers borne in the early spring on bare leafless shoots, on both branches and trunk ("cauliflory"). Cercis is derived from the Greek word κερκις (kerkis) meaning "weaver's shuttle", which was applied by Theophrastus to C. siliquastrum.

Cercis species are used as food plants by the larvae of some Lepidoptera species including mouse moth and Automeris io (both recorded on eastern redbud). The bark of C. chinensis has been used in Chinese medicine as an antiseptic.

Cercis fossils have been found that date to the Eocene.

Species
Cercis comprises the following species:

The Judas tree (Cercis siliquastrum) is 10–15 m tall tree native to the south of Europe and southwest Asia. It is found in Iberia, southern France, Italy, Bulgaria, Greece, and Asia Minor, and forms a low tree with a flat spreading head. In early spring it is covered with a profusion of magenta flowers which appear before the leaves. The flowers are edible and are sometimes eaten in a mixed salad or made into fritters with a flavor described as an agreeably acidic bite. The tree was frequently figured in the 16th and 17th-century herbals.  It is said to be the tree from which Judas Iscariot hanged himself after betraying Christ, but the name may also derive from "Judea's tree", after the region encompassing Israel and Palestine where the tree is commonplace.

A smaller Eastern American woodland understory tree, the eastern redbud, Cercis canadensis, is common from southernmost Canada to Piedmont, Alabama, and East Texas. It differs from C. siliquastrum in its pointed leaves and slightly smaller size (rarely over 12 m tall). The flowers are also used in salads and for making pickled relish, while the inner bark of twigs gives a mustard-yellow dye. It is commonly grown as an ornamental.

The related western redbud, Cercis occidentalis, ranges from California east to Utah primarily in foothill regions.  Its leaves are more rounded at the tip than the relatively heart-shaped leaves of the eastern redbud.  The tree often forms multi-trunked colonies that are covered in bright pink flowers in early spring (February - March).  White-flowered variants are in cultivation. It buds only once a year.

The species of Cercis in North America form a clade. Hopkins (1942) established a two-species system for North
America which is still widely recognized. Alternatively, based on an exploratory morphometric analysis, Isely (1975)
inferred up to six separate entities (“phases”). Barneby (1989) recognized only one continental species and treated
all of western North American Cercis as C. canadensis var. orbiculata, but the justification was cursory and not definitive.
Morphometric studies of North American Cercis  indicate that, although morphological variation is strongly correlated with geography across North America, considerable overlap in flower, fruit, and leaf characters limit their use for taxon delimitation.

In contrast to morphology, molecular phylogenetic analyses recover three geographically well-defined clades
within North America, with California Cercis forming a clade that is sister to a clade formed by Colorado Plateau and
eastern North American clades. Molecular dating suggests a divergence time among these three
clades of at least 12 million years. These clades were also inferred from a distance-based analysis of Cercis in the United
States with isozyme data as reported in an unpublished Ph.D. dissertation (Ballenger 1992). On the basis of these
studies, Cercis is treated as comprising three species, with the Colorado Plateau and all Arizona specimens recognized
as C. orbiculata, distinct from C. occidentalis from California and C. canadensis from eastern North America. This
delimitation of species will also be employed for the treatment of the genus for Flora of North America (Ballenger and
Vincent, in preparation).

The chain-flowered redbud (Cercis racemosa) from western China is unusual in the genus in having its flowers in pendulous  racemes, as in a Laburnum, rather than short clusters.

Species names with uncertain taxonomic status
The status of the following species is unresolved:
 Cercis dilatata Greene
 Cercis ellipsoidea Greene
 Cercis florida Salisb.
 Cercis funiushanensis S.Y.Wang & T.B.Chao
 Cercis georgiana Greene
 Cercis gigantea ined.—giant redbud (China)
 Cercis japonica Siebold ex Planch.
 Cercis latissima Greene
 Cercis nephrophylla Greene
 Cercis nitida Greene
 Cercis pumila W. Young
 Cercis siliquosa St.-Lag.
 Cercis texensis Sarg.
 Cercis × yaltirikii Ponert (hybrid)

Wood
The wood is medium weight, somewhat brittle, of light tan color with a noticeably large heartwood area of darker brown, tinged with red.
The wood has attractive figuring and is used in wood turning, for making decorative items and in the production of wood veneer.

Gallery

References

Further reading

External links

USDA PLANTS Profile
International Plant Names Index 
Tropicos 

 
Fabaceae genera